Aspidosperma megalocarpon is a species of plant in the family Apocynaceae. It can be found in Belize, Colombia, Ecuador, El Salvador, Guatemala, Honduras, Mexico (Veracruz, Oaxaca, Chiapas), Nicaragua, Panama, Suriname, Venezuela, and NW Brazil.

Subspecies
, Plants of the World Online accepted two subspecies:
 Aspidosperma megalocarpon subsp. curranii (Standl.) Marc.-Ferr. - Panama, Colombia
 Aspidosperma megalocarpon subsp. megalocarpon - from Veracruz to NW Brazil

Conservation
Aspidosperma megalocarpon has been assessed as "near threatened". Under the synonym Aspidosperma curranii, A. megalocarpon subsp. curranii has been assessed as "vulnerable".

References

megalocarpon
Near threatened plants
Flora of South America
Flora of Central America
Flora of Mexico
Plants described in 1860
Taxonomy articles created by Polbot